Grigori Shesterikov (born 10 January 1877 (unknown OS/NS), date of death unknown) was a Russian sport shooter who competed in the 1912 Summer Olympics.

In the 1912 Summer Olympics he participated in the following events:

 Team 50 metre military pistol - fourth place
 50 metre pistol - 31st place
 30 metre rapid fire pistol - 32nd place

References

External links
list of Russian shooters 

1877 births
Year of death missing
Male sport shooters from the Russian Empire
ISSF pistol shooters
Olympic competitors for the Russian Empire
Shooters at the 1912 Summer Olympics